is a single by Japanese boy band Kis-My-Ft2. It was released on February 13, 2013. It debuted in number one on the weekly Oricon Singles Chart and reached number one on the Billboard Japan Hot 100. It was the 16th best-selling single in Japan in 2013, with 377,055 copies.

References 

2013 singles
2013 songs
Japanese-language songs
Kis-My-Ft2 songs
Oricon Weekly number-one singles
Billboard Japan Hot 100 number-one singles
Japanese television drama theme songs